Bogor is a city in the West Java province, Indonesia. The city covers an area of 118.50 km2, and it had a population of 950,334 in the 2010 Census and 1,043,070 in the 2020 Census. The official estimate for mid 2022 is 1,099,422. Bogor is an important economic, scientific, cultural, and tourist center, as well as a mountain resort.

During the Middle Ages, the city served as the capital of the Sunda Kingdom and was called Pakuan Pajajaran or Dayeuh Pakuan. During the Dutch colonial era, it was named Buitenzorg ("without worries" in Dutch) and served as the summer residence of the Governor-General of the Dutch East Indies.

The city has a presidential palace and a botanical garden – one of the oldest and largest in the world. It bears the nickname "Rainy City" (Kota Hujan), because of frequent rain showers, even during the dry season.

History

Precolonial period

The first mention of a settlement at present Bogor dates to the 5th century when the area was part of Tarumanagara, one of the earliest states in Indonesian history. After a series of defeats by the neighboring Srivijaya, Tarumanagara was transformed into the Sunda Kingdom, and in 669, the capital of Sunda was built between two parallel rivers, the Ciliwung and Cisadane. It was named Pakuan Pajajaran, in old Sundanese meaning "a place between the parallel [rivers]", and became the predecessor of the modern Bogor.

Over the next several centuries, Pakuan Pajajaran became one of the largest cities in medieval Indonesia with a population reaching 48,000. The name Pajajaran was then used for the entire kingdom, and the capital was simply called Pakuan. The chronicles of that time were written in Sanskrit, which was the language used for official and religious purposes, using the Pallava writing system, on rock stellas called prasasti. The prasasti found in and around Bogor differ in shape and text style from other Indonesian prasasti and are among the main attractions of the city.

From the 9th-15th centuries, the capital moved between Pakuan and other cities of the kingdom, and finally returned to Pakuan by King Siliwangi (Sri Baduga Maharaja) on 3 June 1482 – the day of his coronation. Since 1973, this date is celebrated in Bogor as an official city holiday.

In 1579, Pakuan was captured and almost completely destroyed by the army of the Sultanate of Banten, causing the existence of the State of Sunda to cease. The city was abandoned and remained uninhabited for decades.

Colonial period

Dutch East India Company
In the second half of the 17th century, the abandoned Pakuan as with most of West Java, while formally remaining under the Sultanate of Banten, gradually passed under the control of the Dutch East India Company (VOC). The formal transition occurred on 17 April 1684 with a signed agreement between the Crown Prince of Banten and the VOC.

The first, and temporal, colonial settlement at Pakuan was a camp of lieutenant Tanoejiwa, a Sundanese employed by the VOC who was sent in 1687 to develop the area. It was seriously damaged by the eruption on 4–5 January 1699 of the Mount Salak volcano.  However, the concomitant forest fires removed much forest, leaving much area for the planned rice and coffee plantations. In a short time, several agricultural settlements appeared around Pakuan, the largest being Kampung Baru (lit. "new village").
In 1701, they were combined into an administrative district; Tanoejiwa was chosen as the head of the district and is regarded as the founder of the modern Bogor Regency.

The district was further developed during the 1703 Dutch mission headed by the Inspector General of the VOC Abraham van Riebeeck (the son of the founder of Cape Town Jan van Riebeeck and later Governor of Dutch East Indies). The expedition of van Riebeeck performed a detailed study of the Pakuan ruins, discovered and described many archaeological artifacts, including prasasti, and erected buildings for the VOC employees. The area attracted the Dutch by a favorable geographical position and mild climate, preferred over the hot Batavia which was then the administrative center of the Dutch East Indies. In 1744–1745, the residence of the Governor-General was built in Pakuan which was hosting the government during the summer.

In 1746, by the order of the Governor-General Gustaaf Willem van Imhoff, the Palace, a nearby Dutch settlement and nine native settlements were merged into an administrative division named Buitenzorg (Dutch for "beyond (or outside) concerns," meaning "without worries" or "carefree," cf. Frederick the Great of Prussia's summer palace outside Potsdam, Sanssouci, with the same meaning in French). Around the same time, the first reference to Bogor as the local name of the city was documented; it was mentioned in the administration report from 7 April 1752 with respect to the part of Buitenzorg adjacent to the Palace. Later this name became used for the whole city as the local alternative to Buitenzorg. This name is believed to originate from the Javanese word bogor meaning sugar palm (Arenga pinnata) or bokor (a large bowl made from metal), which is still used in the Indonesian language. Alternative origins are the old-Javanese word bhagar (meaning cow), or simply the misspelling of "Buitenzorg" by the local residents.

The city grew rapidly in the late 18th – early 19th centuries. This growth was partly stimulated by the temporary occupation of the Dutch East Indies by the United Kingdom in 1811–1815 – the British landed on Java and other Sunda Islands to prevent their capture by Napoleonic France which then conquered the Netherlands. The head of the British administration Stamford Raffles moved the administrative center from Batavia to Buitenzorg and implemented new and more efficient management techniques.

Rule of the Kingdom of the Netherlands

After Buitenzorg was returned to the Dutch, it fell under the rule of the Kingdom of the Netherlands rather than VOC. The Buitenzorg Palace was reinstated as the summer residence of the Governor-General. The surrounding territory was also organized into a new Residency, the Buitenzorg Residency. A botanical garden was set up nearby in 1817, which was one of the world's largest gardens in the 19th century.

On 10 October 1834, Buitenzorg was seriously damaged by another eruption of the Salak volcanoes caused by an earthquake. Taking into account the seismic activity of the region, the governor's palace and office buildings constructed in 1840–1850 were built shorter but sturdier than those built prior to the eruption. The Governor's decree of 1845 prescribed separate settlements of European, Chinese and Arab migrants within the city.

In 1860–1880, the largest agricultural school in the colony was established in Buitenzorg. Other scientific institutions including a city library, natural science museum, biology, chemistry, and veterinary medicine laboratories were also constructed during this period. During this time, in 1867, the Buitenzorg Residency was downgraded from a full Residency to an Assistant Residency. By the end of the 19th century, Buitenzorg became one of the most developed and westernized cities in Indonesia.

In 1904, Buitenzorg formally became the administrative center of the Dutch East Indies. However, real management remained in Batavia, which hosted most of the administrative offices and the main office of the governor. This status was revoked in the administrative reform of 1924, which divided the colony into provinces and made Buitenzorg seat of the new Buitenzorg Residency and center of West Java Province.

1942–1950

During World War II, Buitenzorg and the entire territory of the Dutch East Indies were occupied by Japanese forces; the occupation lasted from 6 March 1942 until the summer of 1945. As part of the efforts by the Japanese to promote nationalist (and thus anti-Dutch) sentiments among the local population the city was given the Indonesian name Bogor. The city had one of the major training centres of the Indonesian militia PETA (Pembela Tanah Air – "Defenders of the Motherland").

On 17 August 1945, Sukarno and Hatta proclaimed independence, but the Dutch regained control of the town and adjoining areas. In February 1948, Buitenzorg was included in the quasi-independent state of West Java,() which was renamed Pasundan in April 1948. This state was established by the Netherlands as a step to transform their former colonial possessions in the East Indies into a dependent federation. In December 1949, Pasundan joined the Republic of the United States of Indonesia (RIS) established at the Dutch–Indonesian Round Table Conference of 23 August2 November 1949. In February 1950, as a result of defeat of Pasundan in a quick military conflict with the Republic of Indonesia, the city became part of Indonesia, as formalized in August 1950, and its name was officially declared as Bogor.

As part of Indonesia
As part of independent modern Indonesia, Bogor has a significant role in the cultural, scientific, and economic development of the country and West Java in particular – in part due to the legacy of infrastructure built during the colonial period. Its special position was further reinforced by the transformation of the former summer residence of the governor-general into the summer palace of the President of Indonesia. In the 1990s–2000s, the city regularly hosted various international events, such as ministry-level meetings of the Asia-Pacific institutions and the APEC summit of 15 November 1994.

Geography, topography, geology

The city is situated in the western part of Java island, about 53 km south of the capital Jakarta and 85 km northwest of Bandung, the administrative center of West Java Province. Bogor spreads over a basin near volcanoes Salak, which peaks at about 12 km south, and Mount Gede whose top is 22–25 km south-east of the city. The average elevation is 265 meters, maximum 330 m, and minimum 190 meters above sea level. The terrain is rather uneven: 17.64 km2 of its area has slopes of 0–2°, 80.9 km2 from 2° to 15°, 11 km2 between 15° and 25°, 7.65 km2 from 25° to 40° and 1.20 km2 over 40°; the northern part is relatively flat and the southern part is more hilly.

The soils are dominated by volcanic sedimentary rocks. Given the proximity of large active volcanoes, the area is considered highly seismic. The total area of green space is 205,000 m2, of which 87,000 m2 are Bogor Botanical Gardens, 19,400 m2 are taken by 35 parks, 17,200 m2 by 24 groves and 81,400 m2 are covered with grass.

Several rivers flow through the city toward the Java Sea. The largest ones, Ciliwung and Cisadane, flank the historic city center. Smaller rivers, Cipakancilan, Cidepit, Ciparigi and Cibalok, are guided by cement tubes in many places. It is worth noting that "ci" in the river names merely means "river" in Sundanese, and the actual name begins after it, but the "ci" is nevertheless included into national and international maps. There are several small lakes within the city, including Situ Burung (lit. Bird Lake; "Situ" meaning "Lake") and Situ Gede (lit. Great Lake), with the area of several hectares each. Rivers and lakes occupy 2.89% of the city area.

Climate
Bogor has a tropical rainforest climate (Af) according to the Köppen climate classification, and more humid and rainy than in many other areas of West Java – the average relative humidity is 70%, the average annual precipitation is about 1700 mm, but more than 3500 mm in some areas. Most rain falls between December and February. Because of this weather, Bogor has the nickname "Rain City". The temperatures are lower than in coastal Java: the average maximum is 25.9 °C (cf. 32.2 °C in Jakarta). Daily fluctuations (9–10 °C) are rather high for Indonesia. The absolute maximum temperature was recorded at 38 °C and the minimum at 3 °C.

Demographics
The New American Cyclopaedia of 1867 reported Buitenzorg's population as being 320,756, including 9,530 Chinese, 650 Europeans, and 23 Arabs.

Population
According to the national census held in May–August 2010, 949,066 people were registered in Bogor. The average population density was about 8,000 people per km2; it reached 12,571 persons per km2 in the centre and drops to 5,866 people per km2 in the southern part. Based on dukcapil website, city's population in 2022 is 1,099,422 people, giving a population density of 9,278 people per km2.

The rapid population growth in Bogor after 1960 is related to urbanization as well as the influx of workforce from other parts of the country. The birth rate in 2009 was 563 children per 10,000 people, with the mortality value of 272. During the same year, 12,709 permanent resident moved in and 3,391 people left the city. Men constituted 51.06% and women 48.94% of the population; 28.39% of the inhabitants were under 15 years old, 67.42% were aged 15–65 years and 3.51% – over 65 years. The 2005 estimate of the life expectancy was 71.8 years, which is the highest figure for West Java and one of the highest in Indonesia.

The majority of population (93%) are Muslims with about 6% Christians. However, there are many Christian churches in the city, as well as Buddhist (mostly in the Chinese community) and Hindu communities.

Since 2008, a Christian church congregation in Bogor has been embroiled in conflict with Islamic fundamentalists over the building permit for their new church.

Ethnic groups
According to 2000 Census, most of the population are Sundanese (76%), with the largest immigrant minorities being Betawi, Javanese, Chinese, and other, often mixed ethnicities.

Table based on Ethnicities in the 2000 Indonesian Population Census below;

Administrative districts
Bogor City is surrounded by the Bogor Regency (kabupaten) but in itself is a separate municipality (kota), making Bogor City an enclave within Bogor Regency. The city is divided into six districts (kecamatan), which contain 68 low-level administrative units.

Administration
The city is headed by a mayor, who is elected by the citizens every five years, together with a vice-mayor; in the past, the mayor was appointed by the provincial administration. Diani Budiarto became the first directly elected mayor of Bogor on 25 October 2008 and assumed his position on 7 April 2009. Legislative power is provided by the City Council which consists of 45 people's representatives who are also elected by the residents for a 5-year term. Nine political parties consisting of five factions are represented in the council.

The Coat of arms of Bogor is a rectangular heraldic shield with a pointed base and the side lengths ratio of 5:4, divided by a cross into four parts. The upper left quarter contains the National emblem of Indonesia – the mythical bird Garuda, in the upper right is the presidential palace, in the bottom left is the Salak volcano, and in the lower right is the national Sundanese dagger kujang. The inscription on top reads "KOTA BOGOR", which translates to "THE CITY OF BOGOR".

Economy

Bogor has developed automotive, chemical, and food industries; its outlying areas are used for agriculture. During the colonization, Bogor was mostly producing coffee, rubber and high-quality timber. Chemical industry was introduced to the city at the end of the 19th century, and car and metal production in the 1950s, during the industrialization of independent Indonesia. The fast economic development of the 1980s was slowed down by the crisis of the 1990s and recovered in the early 2000s; so the growth rate of the economy in Bogor was 5.78% in 2002, 6.07% in 2003 and 6.02% in 2009. At the end of 2009, the Gross Regional Product (GRP) was 12.249 trillion IDR (approximately US$1.287 billion) and the investments amounted to 932.295 billion IDR.

Despite the economic growth, the number of citizens living below the poverty level (defined by not only income, but also access to basic social services) is increasing, primarily due to the inflow of poor residents from the surrounding rural areas. In 2009, 17.45% of the population lived below the poverty level, almost twice as high than in 2006 (9.5%) Minimum wage is established by the West Java Governor at 2,658,155 IDR/month.

In 2008 there were 3,208 officially registered industrial enterprises in Bogor employing 54,268 people, more than half (32,237) of whom worked at the 114 largest companies. The outskirts of the city contain about 3,466 hectares of agricultural area, including 111 hectares of water bodies used for fishery and fish farming. The main crops are rice (1165 hectares as of 2007, the annual harvest in 2003 was 9,953 tonnes), various vegetables (772 acres, 8,296 tonnes), corn (382 acres, 6,720 tonnes) and sweet potato (480 acres, 3,480 tonnes). The livestock sector has 25 registered companies (as of 2007) mostly breeding cows (more than 1000 animals yielding more than 2.61 million liters of milk), sheep (about 12,000), chickens (more than 642,000) and ducks (ca. 8,000).

About 25–30 tonnes of various species of fish are produced per year by 4 registered companies. The fishes are mostly bred artificially, in ponds and paddy fields. Breeding aquarium fish and also catching them in their natural habitat is an important industry sector, which yielded US$367,000 from 2008 export sales only, mostly to Japan and Middle East. A substantial part of other Bogor production, 144 billion IDR in 2008, is exported. Examples are clothes and footwear (to US, EU, ASEAN, Canada, Australia, Russia), textiles (US, New Zealand), furniture (South Korea), car tires (ASEAN countries and South America), toys and souvenirs (Japan, Germany, Brazil), soft drinks (ASEAN countries and Middle East). Most of the local sells are carried out via the eight major shopping centers, nine supermarkets and seven major markets.

Transport

Bogor is a major transport center of Java. It contains 599.2 kilometers of roads (as of 2008) which cover 5.31% of the city area; 30.2 kilometers of the roads are of national and 26.8 km of prefectural importance. The 22 transport lines are operated by 3,506 buses and minibuses. In addition, 10 bus routes connect the city with the nearest metropolitan area (4,612 buses) and 40 with other cities of West Java (330 buses).

There are two major bus terminals, Baranangsiang and Bubulak. The former has an area of 22,100 m2 and is dedicated to long-distance and freight traffic while the latter (area 11,850 m2) serves urban passenger routes. A separate station is dedicated to tourist coaches and buses to the nearest Soekarno–Hatta International Airport in Jakarta, located about 55 kilometers from Bogor. Recent years have seen a significant increase in the number of traditional Indonesian rickshaw (becak) at more than 2,000 units as of 2009. The Bogor railway station was built in 1881, and currently serves about 50,000 passengers and has about 70 departures and 70 arrivals per day. The Bogor Paledang railway station opened in 2013 to serve trains to Sukabumi.

Housing and facilities
Residential buildings occupy 26.46% of the city, or 71.11% of its built-up area; 5–14-storey buildings dominate the central part and the outlying areas are mostly built up with single-storeyed houses. The population rise in the 1990s–2000s due to the inflow of external workforce sharply increased the number of substandard housing, mainly on the outskirts of the city. More than half of the slums (1,242,490 m2) are located in northern Bogor, whereas their area is only 89,780 m2 in the southern part of the city. To improve this situation, the city administration launched a program of construction of cheap housing types (light prefabricated houses) in western Bogor. These houses combine reasonable rent ($22 per year) at acceptable living conditions.

Electricity to Bogor is supplied by the Indonesian state company Perusahaan Listrik Negara, which serves the provinces of West Java and Banten. Electricity is provided by more than ten regional thermal and hydroelectric power plants via two local transformer stations located in the Bogor districts of Cimahpar and Cibilong. Whereas most of the houses (excluding some slum areas) are provided with electricity, street lighting covers only 35.38% of the city (4,193 light sources, as of 2007), however, the number of street lights is increasing at an annual rate of 10–15%.

As of 2009, only 47% of Bogor is provided with clean tap water through a centralized water supply systems managed by state-owned Tirta Pakuan. The municipal system takes water from rivers Cisadane (1240 liters per second), and three natural sources: Kota Batu, Bentar-Kambing and Tangka (410 liters per second). Although the water network has a total length of 741 kilometers and covers about 70% of the city, connection to it is often problematic for financial and technical reasons. More than half of residents use water wells or natural reservoirs.

Garbage collection service covers 67% of the urban area. From about 800,000 m3 of waste per year, about 90% is buried at an external landfill at Galuga, about 7% is recycled for compost and about 3% is burned in five incinerators within the city.

The seven cemeteries of Bogor are named by the city districts as Cilendek, Kayumanis, Situgede, Mulyaharja, Blender, Dreded and Gunung Gadung. The first six have the status of "public cemeteries", and have no restrictions by religion or ethnicity. However, given the religious composition of Bogor, the cemeteries are predominantly Muslim, and Christian graves are located either in separate areas of cemeteries or in a small cemetery adjacent to churches. Some mosques also have small burial plots. Graves for the poor and nameless are mostly located at Kayumanis, and Gunung Gadung cemetery is restricted to Chinese residents.

Education and science
Bogor is one of the major scientific and educational centers in Indonesia. A significant part of academic and research base was laid in the period of Dutch colonization. In particular, since the beginning of the 19th century, there were established laboratories and professional schools focused primarily on improving the efficiency of colonial agriculture. In the late 19th – early 20th centuries major scientific institutions were established – the Research Institute and Rubber Research Institute of Forest.

The prevailing profile of research and academic activity was retained in Bogor Indonesia after gaining independence. As in the second half of the 20th century, in the 2000s the strongest areas were agricultural, biology, and veterinary sciences. The main educational and scientific center with the utmost national importance is IPB University, which in addition to educational facilities, includes dozens of research centers and laboratories.

Bogor hosts the global headquarters of the Center for International Forestry Research (CIFOR), an international organization conducting research on forestry and human development. The headquarters of the Organisation for the Preservation of Birds and their Habitat are also in Bogor.

The literacy rate in Bogor (98.7%) is relatively high for Indonesia. IPB University is the main agricultural university of the country. It was founded in 1963 based on the agricultural college, which was established back in the 19th century by the Dutch colonial administration. The largest private universities are Pakuan, Juanda, Nusa Bangsa and Ibn Khaldun. In addition to regular schools, there are over 700 Muslim schools (madrasah) and several Christian schools and colleges.

Most scientific research in Bogor is carried out in agriculture, soil science, dendrology, veterinary and ichthyology. More specific areas include natural pesticides and repellents, intercropping, industrial applications of essential oils and natural alkaloids, increasing yields of various kinds of pepper, improving preservation processes, etc.

Culture
Bogor was the capital of the Sundanese kingdom in the Middle Ages. Sundanese culture was dominant in the same way as the city of Bandung.

Bogor is one of the leading cities of Indonesia by the number of museums, some of which are among the oldest and largest in the country. The Zoological Museum which was opened in 1894 by the Dutch colonial administration as an adjunct to the Botanic Gardens and contains thousands of exhibits. Other prominent museums are more recent. The museum of ethnobotany was opened in 1982 and has more than 2000 exhibits; the museum of the earth (1988) displays hundreds of soil and rock samples from different parts of Indonesia; the museum of the struggle (1957) is devoted to the history of the Indonesian national liberation movement;
and Pembela Tanah Air Museum (1996) reflects the history of the Indonesian military militia PETA (Pembela Tanah Air – "Defenders of the Motherland") created during World War II by the Japanese occupation administration.

The city has a drama theater, dozens of movie theaters, nine of which (as of mid-2010) are built to international standards. The presidential palace, administrative buildings, and universities regularly host art exhibitions, and there are regular festivals of folk art, conferences, and culture-related seminars, such as the Congress of Indonesian culture of 2008.

Coat of Arms
The golden yellow Garuda bird is the National emblem of Indonesia,
The city has a Palace which is represented by a silver palace painting.
Bogor, cannot be separated from the image of Mount Salak depicted in the symbol of a mountain with its four peaks.
The city of Bogor is a heritage from the Kingdom of Pajajaran, this is depicted in the form of a Kujang.

Health
The first hospitals were established in Bogor in the first half of the 19th century by the Dutch authorities. By the early 20th century, there were several civilian hospitals, a military hospital, and a large psychiatric hospital with doctors from Europe and North America. In the 1930s, the Dutch Red Cross Society hospital became the largest in the city. Most of the existing hospitals and clinics were built in the 1980s–1990s. They include 10 hospitals, 373 private clinics, 51 single-doctor clinics, and 134 pharmacies and drug stores, and employ 274 general practitioners, 122 dentists, 74 sanitation doctors, 37 radiologists (X-ray), 141 gynaecologists, 32 nutritionists, 55 assistants, 710 nurses, 63 pharmacists, and 99 doctors of other specialties. 2 new hospitals are founded in 2014

The 14 hospitals of Bogor are:
 Hospital of the Indonesian Red Cross Society – general, the oldest in the city
 General Hospital of Bogor City – general, owned by the city government, formerly Karya Bhakti
 Salak – general, owned by the Indonesian Army
 Atang Sanjaya – general, owned by the Indonesian Air Force, located in airbase area
 Bogor Medical Centre – general practitioners, private
 Islamic Hospital – general
 Azra – general
 Melania – women and children
 Hermina – women and children
 Marzuki Mahdi – infectious diseases and psychiatric hospital
 Mulia- general
 Vania- general, founded in 1 Nov 2014
 BMC- general
 EMC Sentul City()- general

Media
Bogor has three daily Indonesian-language newspapers – Radar Bogor, founded in 1998, Pakuan Raya founded in 2005 and Jurnal Bogor, founded in 2008. they print in about 25,000 copies and have electronic versions. Bogor offices also partly print part some Sundanese and national newspapers. There are a few magazines and scientific publications of the local universities.

The two municipal TV channels, Bogor TV and Megaswara TV, broadcast at UHF channel 25 over the city and nearby areas of West Java. There are also at least 30 local radio stations, of which 20 are in the FM and 10 in the AM range.

Sport
As of March 2010, the Bogor teams were registered in 28 sports to participate in national and regional competitions conducted by the National Sports Committee of Indonesia. At the Java competitions, Bogor athletes took 5 gold medals instead of the planned 42. The largest among 15 sports organizations is the Bogor Football Union, headed by the current Mayor Diani Budiarto. The local football team "PSB Bogor" has never won in the national championships. The local Stadium Pajajaran can accommodate 25,000 spectators.

Travel and places

At a national tourism exhibition of 2010 in Jakarta, Bogor was recognized as the most attractive tourist city in Indonesia. The city and its surrounding area are visited by about 1.8 million people per year, of whom more than 60,000 are foreigners.

The main tourist attraction is the Bogor Botanical Garden. Founded in 1817, it contains more than 6,000 species of tropical plants. Besides, about 42 bird species breed within the garden, although this number is declining and was 62 before 1952. The garden's 87-hectare area within the city was supplemented in 1866 by a 120-hectare park in suburban town of Cibodas. Much of the original rainforest was preserved within the garden providing specimens for scientific studies. The garden was also enriched by collections of palms, bamboos, cacti, orchids and ornamental trees. It became famous in the late 19th century and was visited by naturalists from abroad to conduct scientific research. For example, the Russian St. Petersburg Academy of Sciences had a Buitenzorg scholarship for young scientists to work at Bogor. The staff of Bogor garden also administer three other major gardens of Iindonesia: the Cibodas Botanical Garden founded 1862 in West Java, the Purwodadi Botanical Garden in East Java and the Bali Botanic Garden founded in 1959 on Bali island.

Another tourist attraction is the presidential palace with the total area of 28 hectares, including 1.8492 hectares of the palace buildings. The palace is surrounded by a park with a small pond. The park is home to a herd of tame deer and is open to the public most of the year. The palace is accessible during holidays, such as the City Day and Independence Day; it has a collection of 450 paintings and 360 sculptures.

The city and its suburbs contain dozens of medieval stone stelae (prasasti). Fifteen prasasti of the greatest historical and cultural value are collected in a special pavilion in the district of Batutulis. In the western part of Bogor there is a large lake Gede (area 6 hectares) surrounded by the reserved forest area and a forest park. In the protected area there are several research facilities, and the recreation areas host sports activities, boating, and fishing.

On the grounds of the botanic garden, there is a cemetery established in 1784. It contains 42 historical graves of the Dutch colonial officials, military officers, and scientists, who served in Bogor, Jakarta, and other cities in West Java from the late 18th to early 20th centuries. Nearby, there are three graves from the early Sunda Kingdom (15th century): the wife of the founder of Bogor Siliwangi, Galuh Mangku Alam, vizier Ba'ul, and commander Japra. The locals regard these individuals as the city's patrons.

Other historical places are Bogor Cathedral – built in 1750, it is one of the oldest operational Catholic churches in Indonesia, and the Buddhist temple Hok Tek Bio, built in 1672 in the classical southern Chinese style. It is the first Buddhist temple in Bogor and one of the oldest in Indonesia.

The Jaksa Waterfall is located near the city. It is located within a picturesque lowland rainforest setting.

Bogor launched a bus service that can accommodate 25 passengers who start their tour at the Bogor Botanical Garden. The bus route will start from Botanical Square and end at the same place. The service was unveiled by the mayor of Bogor Bima Arya on 1 January 2017. This bus is called UNCAL, which means "Unforgettable City Tour at Lovable City".

Besides all the tourist attractions above, Bogor also offers a variety of shopping malls or stores including Botani Square, Bogor Trade Mall, Lippo Plaza, Plaza Indah Bogor, etc.

Pura Jagatkarta Hindu temple

The Pura Jagatkarta is a striking Hindu temple located not far to the south of the city.  It is on the northern slopes of Gunung Salak in Ciapus, Tamansari subdistrict, and is easily accessible by car from Bogor.

Kawung Waterfall

Kawung Waterfall (Curug Nangka), is one of the waterfalls located in the Mount Halimun Salak National Park area.

Notable people
The list includes only people with Wikipedia pages in at least three languages.
Adriaan Fokker (1887–1972) – Dutch physicist
Hein ter Poorten (1887–1968) – Commander of the armed forces of the Dutch East Indies in the early second World War II
Ru den Hamer (1917–1988) – Dutch Olympic water polo player
Ayu Utami (born 1968) – Indonesian writer
Rudi Soedjarwo (born 1971) – Indonesian playwright
Suzzanna (1942–2008) – Indonesian actress
Syed Muhammad Naquib al-Attas (born 1931) – Muslim scholar
Jimi Bellmartin (1949–2021) – Dutch singer and Voice Senior winner
  (born 1976) – he is an Indonesian musician and songwriter. He had joined the band Base Jam from its formation until 2000. He also briefly became the guitarist of the singer Bunga Citra Lestari
  (born 1978) – he is an Indonesian singer who was the vocalist for the band  before pursuing a solo career
  (born 1979) – he is an Indonesian journalist, music critic, comedian, actor, director and radio broadcaster. As a journalist, he worked at Trax, Playboy Indonesia, and Rolling Stone Indonesia until 2012. His comedy career started with the Stand Up Comedy Show in 2011. After the event, Soleh starred in several films and received his first wide acclaim in the film  in 2016.
  (born 1983) – she is an Indonesian model, host and actress of Sundanese descent. She started her career from the world of modeling by winning third place in the election of 2005  
 Christian Ronaldo Sitepu (born 1986) – her was an Indonesian basketball player for Satria Muda Pertamina Jakarta and the Indonesia national basketball team

Sister cities

 Lumapas, Brunei Darussalam
 St. Louis, Missouri, United States
  Lloró, Colombia
  Gödöllõ, Hungary
  Salak Tinggi, Malaysia
  Kisarazu, Japan

See also
 List of twin towns and sister cities in Indonesia

Further reading

References

External links
 
 
  

 
Populated places in West Java
1482 establishments in Asia
Populated places established in the 1480s